Ahmed Salah Abdelfatah (born in 1949) is a Dutch actor raised in France who has Moroccan-Yemenite roots. He is usually typecast to play an old Moroccan man, either an imam or a grandfather. He lives in Amsterdam, is married and has a daughter and a son. He has acted in the following productions:

Career
Films
 Coach (2009, Joram Lürsen)
 Dunya & Desie (2008, Dana Nechustan)
 Sextet (2007, Eddy Terstall)
 Color me bad (2007, Hesdy Lonwijk),
 Shouf Shouf Habibi! (2004, Albert ter Heerdt),
 Oesters van Nam Kee (2002, Pollo de Pimentel),
 Polleke (2003, Ineke Houtman),
 Najib en Julia (2003, Theo van Gogh),
 The Zone (2001),
 do not disturb (1999, Dick Maas),

TV
 Onderweg naar Morgen,
 Goede Tijden, Slechte Tijden,
 Shouf Shouf Habibi!, the series,
 Dunya and Desi, the series,

References

External links

Ahmed Salah Abdelfatah in NMO talk show "InFocus" (video) 

1949 births
Living people
Dutch male actors
Dutch people of Yemeni descent
Yemeni actors
Yemeni emigrants to France
Yemeni emigrants to the Netherlands
Yemeni people of Moroccan descent
Moroccan male actors
Moroccan people of Yemeni descent
Moroccan people of Arab descent
Moroccan emigrants to France
Moroccan emigrants to the Netherlands